New Brookland Historic District is a national historic district located at West Columbia, Lexington County, South Carolina. It encompasses 23 contributing buildings in the central business district and the "mill village" sections of West Columbia. It includes commercial, institutional, and residential buildings built between 1894 and 1916 as a planned residential community for the Columbia Duck Mill. Notable buildings include the Edward W. Shull Building, Thompson Funeral Home, Brookland Fire Station, Brookland Jail, and single and double tenant houses.

It was listed on the National Register of Historic Places in 1978.

References

Historic districts on the National Register of Historic Places in South Carolina
Buildings and structures in Lexington County, South Carolina
National Register of Historic Places in Lexington County, South Carolina